The California Sports Hall of Fame recognizes athletes, coaches, and members of sports media who have made a "lasting impression to California sports". It was established in 2006 by Christian Okoye, former running back for the Kansas City Chiefs. The California Sports Hall of Fame made its first Induction in January 2007.  Okoye was inducted in 2016.

History
California Sports Hall of Fame has no permanent headquarters yet. After he was inducted into the Missouri Sports Hall of Fame, Christian Okoye approached the late Bill Walsh, Tommy Lasorda and coach John Wooden to help establish a Hall of Fame in California. 19 Sports heroes were then inducted in the inaugural ceremony.

Selection process
Nominations for the Hall of Fame are open to the public. The public send in names and final selection belong the board member and then current members. The Hall of Fame, with assistance from the president and founder, notifies the winning nominees once the voting process has been tabulated. If the winning nominees accept their induction, they must then attend the dinner celebration to be officially inducted into the Hall of Fame. If a nominee rejects or is unable to attend their induction, the Hall of Fame inducts the next highest vote getter. If a nominee declines their induction for 3 consecutive years without reason, the nominee will not be eligible for the 3 years.

Inductees

2007
Marcus Allen
Elgin Baylor
Wilt Chamberlain
Eric Dickerson
Tom Flores
Chick Hearn
Reggie Jackson
Magic Johnson
Rafer Johnson
Deacon Jones
Jackie Joyner-Kersee
Tommy Lasorda
Bob Mathias
Jim Plunkett
Jackie Robinson
Bill Walsh
Jerry West
Kellen Winslow
John Wooden

2008
De La Salle High School football
Dan Fouts
Cheryl Miller
Willie Mays
Don Quarrie
Vin Scully
UCLA Bruins basketball
Dave Winfield

2009
Steve Garvey
Rosey Grier
Karch Kiraly
Ann Myers-Drysdale
Jim Murray
Mike Powell

2010
Fred Biletnikoff
Jim Hill
Billie Jean King
Merlin Olsen
Jim Otto
Sinjin Smith
Dwight Stones
Bill Walton

2011
Mike Haynes
Tony Lopez
Bob Miller
Ken Norton
Dick Vermeil

2012
Rick Barry
John Carlos
Marcel Dionne
Ted Hendricks
Anthony Muñoz
Tommie Smith

2013
Florence Griffith Joyner
Tony Gwynn
Greg Louganis
Joe Montana
John Robinson
Luc Robitaille

2014
1972 USC Trojans football team
Bo Jackson
Lisa Leslie
John McKay
Jackie Slater
James Worthy

2015
Lisa Fernandez
Michael Garrett
Danny Lopez
Warren Moon
Jamaal Wilkes

2016
Lindsay Davenport
Jim Fox
Dr. Frank Jobe
Ralph Lawler
Ronnie Lott
Christian Okoye
Fernando Valenzuela

2017
John Force
Michelle Kwan
James Lofton
Byron Scott
Leigh Steinberg

2018
Cliff Branch
Tim Brown
Michael Cooper
Tony La Russa
Stan Morrison

2019
Barry Bonds
Dr. Jerry Buss
Todd Christensen
Jim Gray
Marques Johnson
Fred Roggin

2022
Al Davis
Roy Firestone
John Madden
Bill Plaschke
Ted Robinson

2023
Tracy Austin
Terry Donahue
Kenny Easley
Alexi Lalas
Rick Lozano

External links
California Sports Hall of Fame

Hall of fame
Halls of fame in California
State sports halls of fame in the United States
All-sports halls of fame
Awards established in 2006
2006 establishments in California